The third season of Hey Gorgeous, a Singaporean talent-scouting competition which searches for new talents in tertiary institutes, premiered on 24 August 2015 on MediaCorp Channel 8, and broadcast on Mondays from 8pm to 9pm. This season marks the first time the contest is aired on MediaCorp Channel 8, instead of MediaCorp Channel U in which the first two seasons were aired. In this season, the number of semifinalists has been downsized from 24 to 21, while the number of finalists has been downsized from 12 to eight. A total of seven tertiary institutions participate in this contest, namely Singapore Polytechnic, Temasek Polytechnic, Nanyang Polytechnic, Ngee Ann Polytechnic, National University of Singapore, Republic Polytechnic and Nanyang Academy of Fine Arts. Elvin Ng and Carrie Wong serve as the celebrity ambassadors for this season. Gan Zhi Jian from Singapore Polytechnic was crowned winner of this season.

Judges and hosts
Dasmond Koh and Ben Yeo return as hosts for this season. This time round, they are joined by Vivian Lai and Kate Pang.
During the semifinals, Sheila Sim, Xu Bin and Kym Ng form the judging panel.

Semifinalists
 Colour key

Campus Search
In the first seven episodes, the hosts select good-looking students from each campus. Six of them are selected, and are treated to challenging games. The contestants are given points based on their overall performances. The contestant with the highest initial score advanced to the semifinals, together with two contestants who receive an extra of 10 points from the hosts. If a total of extra 20 points is given to a contestant, then the one with the second highest initial score will also advance to the semifinals.

Episode 1 (24 August, Singapore Polytechnic)
This episode was filmed on 2 July, and aired on 24 August.

Episode 2 (31 August, Temasek Polytechnic)
This episode was filmed on 15 July, and aired on 31 August.

Soh was unable to attend the semifinals due to personal reasons.

Episode 3 (7 September, Nanyang Polytechnic)
This episode was filmed on 29 July, and aired on 7 September.

Episode 4 (14 September, Ngee Ann Polytechnic)
This episode was filmed on 5 August, and aired on 14 September.

Episode 5 (21 September, National University of Singapore)
This episode was filmed on 13 August, and aired on 21 September.

Episode 6 (28 September, Republic Polytechnic)
This episode was filmed on 18 August, and aired on 28 September.

Episode 7 (5 October, Nanyang Academy of Fine Arts)
This episode was filmed on 19 August, and aired on 5 October.

Semifinals
During the semifinals, the semifinalists travel to Clubmed Bintan on a 3-day-2-night bootcamp, where they are divided into three teams, and go through three rounds of outdoor activities and games to test their wits. Afterwards, each group has to do a fashion photoshoot where they are photographed by renowned photographers and are photographed individually and as a group. 12 students will be eliminated and 8 will advance to the finals. Sheila Sim, Xu Bin and Kym Ng serve as the guest judges for the semifinals. Episode 7 was broadcast on 12 October while Episode 8 was broadcast on 19 October.

Teams

Game results

 Host Vivian Lai played as back-up for the team in "Jump and Snap" and "Working As One".

 Host Kate Pang played as back-up for the team in "Row, Row, Row Your Boat".

Grand Finals
The grand finals was broadcast live on 26 October at 8 pm, and was held at the MediaCorp TV Theatre. The finalists have to show their EQ, fashion sense and wit through a series of performances and questions. Winners will be chosen 100% by public voting. Meanwhile, the London Choco Roll Most Charming Smile Award is given to the finalist who displays the best smile, and is also chosen through public voting. Elvin Ng and Carrie Wong are the guest stars during the finals, and they performed "满满的幸福", theme song of Channel 8 drama Sealed with a Kiss. In this season, Gan Zhi Jian was crowned winner while Hor Ying Ying received the London Choco Roll Most Charming Smile Award.

Talent Show
In this segment, each finalist has to put up a dance performance to showcase their talent.

Elimination chart
Result details

References

2015 Singaporean television seasons